Andrew Sims may refer to:

 Sims (rapper), real name Andrew Sims, member of the indie hip hop collective Doomtree
 Andrew Sims (psychiatrist), British psychiatrist